Josephine or Josie Johnson may refer to:

People
Josephine Johnson (1910–1990), American novelist, poet, and essayist
Josie R. Johnson (born 1930), African American civil rights activist

Fictional characters
Josephine Johnson, character in Best Friends Getting Sorted
Lorraine Toussaint played Josephine Johnson in The Line
Josie Johnson, see List of Brookside characters#J
Josie Johnson, character in 20 Mule Team

See also
Josephine Johnson Genzabuke, Tanzania politician